This is a list of comic books, comic strips, and webcomics that feature anthropomorphic animals.

Comic books

Anthology series 
Albedo Anthropomorphics (including Erma Felna: EDF)
Critters
Furrlough
 Genus (including Genus Male)
Tales from the Aniverse

Contemporary drama 

 Blacksad
 Elephantmen
 Fish Police
 Grandville
 Nordguard
 Omaha the Cat Dancer

Fantasy adventure 

Katmandu

Superhero 

 Army Surplus Komikz, featuring Cutey Bunny
 Atomic Mouse - Shanda Fantasy Arts revival
 Buster the Amazing Bear
 Fission Chicken
 Super Dinosaur

Comic strips and webcomics 

Anima: Age of the Robots
Inherit the Earth
Kevin and Kell
Lackadaisy
The Ongoing Adventures of Rocket Llama
Ozy and Millie
Pearls Before Swine (comics)
T.H.E. Fox
XDragoon

References

External links
Comics category at WikiFur

Furry comics, List of
 List of furry comics